The Medal of Faithful Service was instituted by King Carol I in April 1878. In early 1948, together with the Order, Cross and all the traditional Romanian orders was disbanded by the communist authorities.

In 2000 it was re-instituted together with the Order and Cross, as a three class medal. It is the second most important award for people without higher education, the equivalent of the Order of Faithful Service.

References

External links
World Medal Index - Republic of Romania: Medal of Faithful Service

Military awards and decorations of Romania
National Order of Faithful Service
Awards established in 1878
1878 establishments in Romania